Birohar is a village located in the Matanhail tehsil of Jhajjar district in Haryana, India.

Demographics 
The population of Birohar was estimated to be close to 6500 persons in the 2011 Indian census.

Notable places 
There is ancient Baba Rughnath Temple in the village.

Incidents 
On November 12, 1996, the wreckage of an Ilyushin II-76TD aircraft involved in the Charkhi Dadri Mid Air Collision hit the ground in the village premises.

Nearby villages
Nimli
Khachrauli
Maliyawas
Kaliyawas
Bhagwi

References 

Villages in Jhajjar district